Uromyces inconspicuus is a plant pathogen infecting hemp.

References

External links
 Index Fungorum
 USDA ARS Fungal Database

Fungal plant pathogens and diseases
Hemp diseases
inconspicuus